Inter Club Brazzaville is a Congolese sports club (basketball, football and volleyball) based in Brazzaville. Orlando Magic basketball player, Serge Ibaka played for the team as a sixteen-year-old.

Basketball

Notable players
 Set a club record or won an individual award as a professional player.
 Played at least one official international match for his senior national team or one NBA game at any time.

 Bertrand Boukinda
 Japhie Nguia
 Max Kouguere 
 Serge Ibaka

Football

Honours
Congo Premier League: 2
1988, 1990.

Coupe du Congo: 3
1978, 1985, 1987.

Super Coupe du Congo: 0

References

 Congo - List of Champions (rsssf)

Basketball teams in the Republic of the Congo
Football clubs in the Republic of the Congo
Sports clubs in Brazzaville